Phytocoris dimidiatus is a species of plant bugs belonging to the family Miridae, subfamily Mirinae.

Description
The species have black coloured pronotum with brownish or black upperside.

Distribution
It is found in most parts of Europe and then East across the Palearctic to Central Asia

EcologyPhytocoris dimidiatus'' is found on deciduous trees, especially oak. Flight time is from June to October.

References

External links
Phytocoris dimidiatus images at  Consortium for the Barcode of Life

Insects described in 1856
Hemiptera of Europe
Phytocoris